Perhabdovirus is a genus of viruses in the family Rhabdoviridae, order Mononegavirales. Fish serve as natural hosts. Diseases associated with viruses of this genus include: breathing and swimming problems.

Taxonomy

Structure
Perhabdovirions are enveloped, with bullet shaped geometries. Perhabdovirus genomes are linear, around 11.1 kb in length. The genome codes for 5 proteins.

Life cycle
Viral replication is cytoplasmic. Entry into the host cell is achieved by attachment of the viral G glycoproteins to host receptors, which mediates clathrin-mediated endocytosis. Replication follows the negative stranded RNA virus replication model. Negative stranded RNA virus transcription, using polymerase stuttering is the method of transcription. The virus exits the host cell by budding, and  tubule-guided viral movement. Fish serve as the natural host.

References

External links
 Viralzone: Perhabdovirus
 ICTV

Rhabdoviridae
Virus genera